Christian Simard (born December 22, 1954 in Chicoutimi, Quebec (now Saguenay, Quebec)) is a Canadian politician. He is the brother of MNA Sylvain Simard.

A director general, political adviser and project coordinator, Simard was first elected to the House of Commons of Canada in the 2004 federal election. As the Bloc Québécois candidate in the riding of Beauport, in Quebec City, he defeated the Liberal candidate Dennis Dawson by over 11,000 votes. Simard was the Bloc's critic to Housing. However, in the 2006 election he was defeated by the Conservative's Sylvie Boucher in the riding of Beauport—Limoilou by less than 1000 votes.

He ran unsuccessfully as the Parti Québécois candidate in Jean-Lesage in the 2007 Quebec election.

Electoral record

External links
 

1954 births
Living people
Bloc Québécois MPs
Members of the House of Commons of Canada from Quebec
Politicians from Saguenay, Quebec
21st-century Canadian politicians